Conrado Pérez Armenteros (born December 21, 1950 in Villa Clara Province) is a former basketball player from Cuba, who won the bronze medal with the men's national team at the 1972 Summer Olympics in Munich, West Germany.

References
databaseOlympics

1950 births
Living people
People from Villa Clara Province
Cuban men's basketball players
1970 FIBA World Championship players
1974 FIBA World Championship players
Basketball players at the 1968 Summer Olympics
Basketball players at the 1972 Summer Olympics
Olympic bronze medalists for Cuba
Olympic medalists in basketball
Medalists at the 1972 Summer Olympics
Olympic basketball players of Cuba